Bobby Wilson is a mathematician and Assistant Professor at the University of Washington.

Professional career and research
Wilson obtained his Ph.D. at the University of Chicago in 2015 under the supervision of Wilhelm Schlag. He was an undergraduate at Morehouse College. He was a CLE Moore Instructor at MIT 2015-2018. He was twice an MSRI Postdoctoral Fellow (New Challenges in PDE and Harmonic Analysis) and will participate in the MSRI program Mathematical problems in fluid dynamics in 2021. His research "has been primarily concerned with questions concerning structure theory of measures and the dynamics of dispersive evolutionary equations."

Honors
In 2020, he was awarded one of three Karen EDGE Fellowships and he was profiled in Mathematically Gifted & Black.

References

External links
 Math Sci Net Publications Search

Living people
21st-century American mathematicians
African-American mathematicians
University of Chicago alumni
University of Washington faculty
Fellows of the American Mathematical Society
Year of birth missing (living people)
21st-century African-American people